Ippolito or Eppolito is an Italian surname and given name, and the Italian form of the name of Saint Hippolytus of Rome. It may refer to:

Given name
 Ippolito Adobrandini, birth name of Pope Clement VIII (1536–1605)
 Ippolito Aldobrandini (cardinal) (1596–1638), Italian cardinal, grandnephew of the above
 Ippolito Maria Beccaria (1550–1600), Italian Dominican and Master of the Order of Preachers
 Ippolito Caffi (1809–1866), Italian painter
 Ippolito Desideri (1684–1733), Italian Jesuit missionary and traveller 
 Ippolito d'Este (1509–1572), Italian cardinal and Archbishop of Esztergom
 Ippolito II d'Este (1509–1572), Italian cardinal
 Ippolito del Donzello (1455–?), Italian painter and architect
 Ippolito Galantini (painter) (1627–1706), Italian painter of the Baroque period
 Ippolito Galantini (teacher) (1565–1619), Italian Roman Catholic founder of the Congregation of Christian Doctrine of Florence
 Ippolito de' Medici ((1511–1535), illegitimate only son of Giuliano di Lorenzo de' Medici, Lord of Florence
 Ippolito Nievo (1831–1861), Italian writer, journalist and patriot
 Ippolito Pindemonte (1753–1828), Italian poet
 Ippolito Rosellini (1800–1843), Italian Egyptologist
 Ippolito Rotoli (1914–1977), Italian Roman Catholic prelate, archbishop and papal nuncio

Surname
 Angelica Ippolito (born 1944), Italian actress
 Ciro Ippolito (born 1947), Italian film director and producer
 Dalila Ippolito (born 2002), Argentine footballer
 Dennis Ippolito (born 1942), professor of political science at Southern Methodist University
 Ian Ippolito, American serial entrepreneur and the founder of numerous tech companies
 Louis Eppolito, NYPD officer and mafia contract killer
 Jon Ippolito (born 1962), American artist and educator
 Nunziante Ippolito (1796–1851), Italian physician and anatomist
 Tony Ippolito (1917–1951), American National Football League player

See also 
 Sant'Ippolito (disambiguation)

Italian masculine given names
Italian-language surnames